Kakavaberd or Kaqavaberd (Eastern Armenian Kak’avaberd; also known as Geghi Berd, Keghi Berd or Kegh ( Gełi Berd) is a fortress on a ridge overlooking the Azat River gorge at Khosrov Forest State Reserve in Ararat Province, Armenia.

Site 
The fortified walls of Kakavaberd are well preserved and crown a ridge within the Khosrov State Reserve. It is inaccessible from three of its sides because of the steep terrain. Within the fortress are the ruins of a church and other structures.

History 
The fortress was first mentioned by Hovhannes Draskhanakerttsi (John V the Historian) in the 9th-10th centuries in his History of Armenia as being controlled by the Armenian noble Bagratuni family.  He wrote that in 924, after losing a battle at the island of Sevan, the commander and chief Beshir went on to attack the fortress of Kakavaberd.  He was later beaten by Gevorg Marzpetuni.  The same event is recorded in the book "Armenia and the Armenians" (1874) by James Issaverdens where he writes,

 
In the 11th century it passed over to the Pahlavuni family, and in the 12th–13th century to the Proshyan family for whom the nearby town is named.  Kakavaberd was last mentioned in the year 1224 when after losing a battle that took place near Garni, Ivane Mkhargrdzeli found shelter there. 

Muratsan has also mentioned the fortress in Gevorg Marzpetuni (1896), a historical novel set in Armenia in the 10th century.

References 

 
 

Archaeological sites in Armenia
Buildings and structures in Ararat Province
Castles in Armenia
Forts in Armenia
Tourist attractions in Ararat Province